Edward Joseph Maginn (January 4, 1897 – August 21, 1984) was a Roman Catholic bishop.

Born in Glasgow, Scotland, Maginn was ordained to the priesthood on July 27, 1922. On June 27, 1957, Maginn was named titular bishop of Curium and auxiliary bishop of the Roman Catholic Diocese of Albany, New York. Maginn was consecrated bishop on September 12, 1957, and retired on July 8, 1972.

Notes

1897 births
1984 deaths
20th-century American Roman Catholic titular bishops
Clergy from Glasgow
Scottish emigrants to the United States